Roger Hitoto (born 24 February 1969) is a Congolese footballer who played as a midfielder in France for FC Rouen, Lille, FC Mantes, CMS Oissel and Arménienne ASOA.

External links

 Player profile at LFP

1969 births
People from Mbandaka
Living people
Democratic Republic of the Congo footballers
Association football midfielders
Democratic Republic of the Congo international footballers
1996 African Cup of Nations players
1998 African Cup of Nations players
FC Rouen players
Lille OSC players
FC Mantois 78 players
CMS Oissel players
Ligue 1 players
Ligue 2 players
Democratic Republic of the Congo expatriate footballers
Democratic Republic of the Congo expatriate sportspeople in France
Expatriate footballers in France